Emma Haruka Iwao is a Japanese computer scientist and cloud developer advocate at Google. In 2019 Haruka Iwao calculated the then world record for most accurate value of pi (π); which included 31.4 trillion digits, exceeding the previous record of 22 trillion. This record was surpassed in 2020 by Timothy Mullican who calculated 50 trillion digits, but she reclaimed the record in 2022 with 100 trillion digits. She identifies as queer.

Early life and education 
As a child, Iwao became interested in pi. She was inspired by Japanese mathematicians, including Yasumasa Kanada. She studied computer science at the University of Tsukuba, where she was taught by Daisuke Takahashi. She was awarded the Dean's Award for Excellence in 2008, before starting graduate studies in computing. Her master's dissertation considered high performance computer systems. After graduating, Iwao took on several software engineering positions, working on site reliability for Panasonic, GREE and Red Hat.

Career 
Iwao joined Google as a Cloud Developer Advocate in 2015. She originally worked for Google in Tokyo, before moving to Seattle in 2019. Iwao offers training in the use of the Google Cloud Platform (GCP), as well as supporting application developers. She works to make cloud computing accessible for everyone, creating online demos and teaching materials.

In March 2019 Iwao calculated the value of pi to 31,415,926,535,897 digits (Equal to ), using 170 terabytes (TB) of data. The calculation used a multithreaded program called y-cruncher using over 25 machines for 121 days.

See also
 Chronology of computation of π

References

Japanese women mathematicians
Japanese women computer scientists
World record holders
Living people
Year of birth missing (living people)
University of Tsukuba alumni
Japanese LGBT scientists
Queer women
Queer scientists
Japanese emigrants to the United States
Google employees
Pi-related people